Paint Louis is an annual global community event happening over the American holiday Labor Day bringing together people practicing all four elements of Hip hop including Graffiti, Breakdancing, Rapping and DJs to St. Louis for three days of creation and performance. The event started informally in 1995 as a "graffiti jam" and became more formalized in 1997 as noted with its 20th anniversary celebration in 2017. One of the originators, if not the man outright credited with the genesis of Paint Louis, is Stun1.

The event is well known as the largest gathering of Graffiti writers who have permission to legally paint the 1.9 mile Guinness Records deemed "longest mural in the world", the Mississippi River flood wall, along the Mississippi river all south of the Gateway Arch.

Paint Louis is an international gathering of writers from around the world:

"We bring artists from Australia, Japan, Brazil, we got people coming from Africa, we got Tibetan monks that we bring out every year," [Harrington] says. "They're from all over, Mexico City. So it's international."

Program

The Event 

Two days of graffiti writing and painting usually from the Saturday and Sunday of the main event period over American Labor Day holiday.

Scrap Cans for Kids 

Extra cans called "scrap cans" are made available for free on the Saturday of the event to function as an outreach program to the community where seasoned graffiti writers teach kids the basics of graffiti writing. It is a family friendly event.

Timeline

1995 - 1996 

Group of local St. Louis graffiti writers come together to do a "graffiti jam".

1997 

The first year of Paint Louis.

1998 

Paint Louis 1998 had formal t-shirts and a DVD documentary created about the event. Rappers Fat Joe and Big Pun came to the event and painted murals. Tribal Street Wear and Starbucks Frappuccino sponsored the event. And, the Guinness Book of World Records named the Paint Louis wall as the longest graffiti mural in the world.

2001 

Artists came to the city and "bombed" the city by painting all over downtown and outside the boundaries of the Paint Louis river wall causing problems and millions of dollars of damage, and the city of St. Louis shutdown the event.

2012 

Two of the original committee members decided to initiate the event formally again with the support of city officials. Artists included Whisper, Stun1 and Peat Wollaeger.

2013 

By 2013, Paint Louis hosted 300 artists and had around 1,000 people attend and took place earlier than Labor Day on June 21–23, 2013.

2014 

Paint Louis 2014 took place from August 29, 2014 until September 1, 2014 with 200 artists, 1 mile of wall, over 4 days.

Organizers included John Harrington from Midwest Avengers and AJ Sanchez. Organizers spent more than $10,000 to get Paint Louis off the ground. Jona Anderson, better known as Stun or Stun1, said about Paint Louis, "This is like the Super Bowl of graffiti."

2015 

Paint Louis 2015 took place Labor Day 2015. After Paint Louis 2015, organizer John Harrington stated that he fears Paint Louis will be cancelled in the future. He noted that 200 writers were invited to participate and propose their works so that wall space may be allocated. But, over 350 writers showed up who did not go through the submission process, so complications arose from the overload. Some artists were unhappy and took action.

Whatever their reasons for not participating, a number of artists took it upon themselves to host their own party – painting unsanctioned areas all over town, or “bombing the city,” as Harrington and Bero describe it.

Harrington went onto create a cleanup crew of 30 of the Paint Louis event participants who took tips on locations to unsanctioned graffiti to cleanup for free. The crew spent $1,200 to cleanup works receiving complaints.

Harrington believes the sanctioned art created legally on the flood wall during Paint Louis has real value – and serves as snapshot of the community's concerns at this moment in time.

2016 

Paint Louis 2016 took place Labor Day 2016 and was not cancelled as had been predicted in 2015 and consisted of International artists. The size of the wall also reported as "20-feet-by-4-miles."

2017 

Paint Louis 2017 took place from September 22–24, 2017, the 20th anniversary of Paint Louis.

2018 

Paint Louis 2018 took place Labor Day Weekend from August 31 until September 2, 2018.

Performances happened by F.R.E.S.H. Hip Hop St. Louis, Basement Sound System DJ Collective, Far Fetched Music Collective and Jonezy & Friends.

2019 

Paint Louis 2019 continued the annual tradition of graffiti writing from August 28 until September 2, 2019. Paint Louis 2019 focused on women's presence in the art form. Co-founder John Harrington said that 212 artists registered but more than 250 participated at the event to paint 20-foot high murals on the longest graffiti wall in the world.

2020 

Paint Louis 2020 is to be held online as an open call for participation. John Harrington, Paint Louis co-founder and organizer stated, “Paint Louis has always been about showcasing local St. Louis artists and Midwest artists as a whole. Over the years, we expanded it to all street and mural artists and it has become an international event. Due to Covid-19, we feel the best way to keep the event safe this year is to do a virtual event featuring all types of visual artists including canvas painters, graphic designers, digital artists, air brushers, muralists, and graffiti art.” All activity for Paint Louis 2020 is organized on the official project webpage.

2021 

Paint Louis 2021 is scheduled for September 3 - September 5.

See also 

 Hip hop
 Graffiti
 Graffiti in the United States

References

External links 

 Official Facebook

Graffiti and unauthorised signage
Music festivals in Missouri
Missouri culture
Graffiti in the United States